István Varga (22 August 1960 – 13 February 2023) was a Hungarian judoka. He competed in the men's half-heavyweight event at the 1988 Summer Olympics.

References

External links
 

1960 births
2023 deaths
Hungarian male judoka
Olympic judoka of Hungary
Judoka at the 1988 Summer Olympics
Sportspeople from Békés County